is a sports park in Yumenoshima, Kōtō Ward, Tokyo, Japan. It was made by improving a landfill site called Yumenoshima, which had been the final disposal site for garbage from 1957 until 1967. Yumenoshima was the site of the archery event of the Tokyo Olympic Games in 2020.

Facilities
 Yumenoshima Stadium containing sports facilities such as a track and field area
 Barbecue area
 Tokyo Sports Culture Center (nicknamed BumB)
 Yumenoshima Tropical Greenhouse Dome, a botanical garden
 Tokyo Metropolitan Daigo Fukuryū Maru Exhibition Hall

Admission fee
Admission to the park is free of charge, but the Tropical Greenhouse Dome and sports facilities require a fee.

Opening times and holidays
The park is open all year round. However, the barbecue area is closed on New Year's holidays while the Tropical Greenhouse Dome and Daigo Fukuryū Maru Exhibition Hall are closed on New Year's holidays and Mondays.

Festival
The Akahata Matsuri (literally, Red Flag Festival) is sometimes held in the park. Organised by the Japanese Communist Party, it takes place once every four years or so and lasts about 2 or 3 days. The most recent one was in November 2014.

2020 Olympics
Yumenoshima Park was the venue for archery events in the 2020 Tokyo Olympics. It also hosted archery for the 2020 Paralympics. The qualification field was completed in February 2019.  A test event for the Olympic and Paralympic Games archery events was held in July 2019.

Gallery

Access
Two minutes' walk from Shin-Kiba Station on the Tokyo Metro Yūrakuchō Line, Keiyō Line and Rinkai Line.
Three city buses (Toei Bus) stop at the park.
There are also two parking lots; one on the south side has space for 352 vehicles while another on the north side can hold 103.

See also
 Parks and gardens in Tokyo
 National Parks of Japan

References

 Yumenoshima website

External links
 Tokyo Park website 

Venues of the 2020 Summer Olympics
Olympic archery venues
Parks and gardens in Tokyo